Robert Logan (born February 22, 1964) is a Canadian former professional ice hockey player.

Career 
Logan played 42 games in the National Hockey League, thirty-eight with the Sabres and four with the Los Angeles Kings between 1986 and 1988. He scored ten goals and added five assists in his NHL career. He was drafted in the fifth round, 100th overall, by the Buffalo Sabres in the 1982 NHL Entry Draft.

Personal life 
Logan has two daughters.

Career statistics

Regular season and playoffs

Awards and honors

References

External links
 

1964 births
Living people
Anglophone Quebec people
Buffalo Sabres draft picks
Buffalo Sabres players
Canadian ice hockey left wingers
HC Ambrì-Piotta players
Ice hockey people from Montreal
Los Angeles Kings players
New Haven Nighthawks players
Rochester Americans players
Yale Bulldogs men's ice hockey players